Colonel Charles Henry "Mac" MacDonald (November 23, 1914 – March 3, 2002) was a United States Air Force officer and a fighter ace of World War II. MacDonald commanded the 475th Fighter Group for 20 months in his P-38 Lightning, "Putt Putt Maru", and become the third ranking fighter ace in the Pacific during World War II.

Early life
MacDonald was born in DuBois, Pennsylvania on November 23, 1914. He entered the U.S. Army Air Corps pilot training program after graduating from Louisiana State University in 1938.

He received his flight wings and was commissioned a Second Lieutenant at Kelly Field, Texas on May 25, 1939. His first assignment was to the 55th Pursuit Group, he later transferred to the 18th Pursuit Group at Wheeler Field, Hawaii on February 9, 1941, and was at Pearl Harbor on December 7, 1941.

After flying patrol for an hour and a half, MacDonald and his small group of planes headed back to Hawaii, but encountered a fierce hail of flak from nervous and shaken gunners. MacDonald had to run the gauntlet in order to land his aircraft.

He remained in Hawaii until early 1943, and was sent back to the United States to help train a P-47 Thunderbolt squadron in Massachusetts.

World War II

MacDonald then served in the United States with the 326th Fighter Group before transferring to the 348th Fighter Group to command the 340th Pursuit Squadron at Westover Field, Massachusetts.

On October 1, 1943, then a major, joined the 475th Fighter Group at Dobodura, New Guinea as the group executive officer. He scored his first four victories that month and became an ace on November 9, 1943, when he downed two Zekes near Alexishafen Airdrome. He was promoted to lieutenant colonel the following day on November 10, 1943, and became the group commander.

While he was CO of the 432nd Squadron, MacDonald demonstrated his leadership on an October 25 mission to Rabaul. While leading a formation of P-38's flying escort for some B-24 Liberators on a Rabaul strike, heavy weather closed in, and all P-38's except MacDonald's flight turned back. Suddenly, the weather cleared and the formation of B-24's, with hardly an escort, was attacked by  A6M Zeros.

MacDonald and his flight darted in and out of the bomber formation, clearing the Zeros from the bombers tails. They couldn't spend time finishing off damaged enemy aircraft nor confirming kills. Through their skill and diligence, they prevented many bombers from being shot down. But another pilot could confirm one kill by MacDonald, a Zero, his fourth aerial victory overall. For his actions, he was awarded the Distinguished Service Cross.

MacDonald moved up to Group Commander in Nov. 1943, replacing George Prentice who was rotated home. Leading the group for 20 months, Colonel "Mac" flew his P-38, Putt-Putt-Maru, with the unit number "100."

During early April, he led the 475th on missions over the Japanese stronghold of Hollandia, in northwest Guinea; by the end of the month, it had fallen.

In mid 1944, General George Kenney arranged for Charles A. Lindbergh to visit and fly with the 475th. He was able to teach the P-38 pilots to increase their operational range by 50%. During his stay with the 475th, he and MacDonald became good friends, and earned MacDonald's respect as an excellent pilot.

On July 28, 1944, Lindbergh flew on an apparent milk run with MacDonald. However, this "uneventful" mission became a sticky situation. A Japanese fighter broke through their formation and set his sights on Lindbergh's P-38. They were on a collision course, guns blazing from both airplanes, when at the last moment, Lindbergh pulled up. The wounded Japanese fighter could not follow and dove into the sea.

General Paul Wurtsmith put MacDonald on a one-month "punitive leave" for allowing the national hero to get into a dangerous situation. MacDonald returned to the 475th in time to lead the group during the momentous events surrounding the liberation of the Philippines.

He flew several sorties over Philippine Islands and shot down thirteen of his kills in the seven weeks between Nov. 10, 1944 and Jan. 1, 1945. One of his most memorable missions occurred on 25 December 1944 when he destroyed three Japanese fighters over Clark Field in the Philippines. He scored his last aerial victory on 13 March 1945, bringing his total to 27.

He finished the war with 27 confirmed victories, making him the third highest ranking U.S. Army fighter pilot of the Pacific Theater.

Later life

MacDonald returned to the United States in July 1945 where he served in various staff and command assignments, including the 33rd Fighter Group and 23rd Fighter Wing commander, Air Attaché to Sweden, and instructor at the US War College in Washington, D.C. before retiring from the Air Force as a colonel in July 1961.

Colonel MacDonald's retirement ceremony at McChord AFB near Tacoma, Washington included a performance by the USAF Thunderbirds and a declaration of 'Col. Charles MacDonald Day'. He then moved to Anacortes, Washington where he opened a real estate business selling island properties in Puget Sound (an excuse to pursue his love of sailing) and his four children finished High School.

In 1971 he closed the real estate business, sailed to Mexico, and in 1973 returned to San Diego, California where he and his wife sold the boat that he had first purchased while in Sweden. They spent the next year building a new boat then Colonel MacDonald and his wife spent their time sailing the Pacific and the Caribbean until her death in 1978. He then came ashore and settled back to where he grew up in Mobile, Alabama.

He died on March 3, 2002, at the age of 87.

Decorations
His awards and decorations include:

Distinguished Service Cross citation (1st Award)

MacDonald, Charles H.
Colonel (Air Corps), U.S. Army Air Forces
457th Fighter Group, 5th Air Force
Date of Action:  December 7, 1944

Citation:

The President of the United States of America, authorized by Act of Congress, July 9, 1918, takes pleasure in presenting the Distinguished Service Cross to Colonel (Air Corps) Charles Henry MacDonald, United States Army Air Forces, for extraordinary heroism in connection with military operations against an armed enemy while serving as Pilot of a P-38 Fighter Airplane in the 475th Fighter Group, Fifth Air Force, in action over Ormoc Bay, Leyte, Philippine Islands, on 7 December 1944. During the surprise landing of troops from an allied convoy at Ormoc Bay, Colonel MacDonald voluntarily led a two-plane flight of P-38's to join another flight covering the friendly shipping. On approaching the area he sighted three enemy fighters heading for our convoy, and with complete disregard for his own safety he promptly attacked the enemy flight leader. Pressing his attack close, he shot down one enemy fighter and assisted in the destruction of another. Returning to his home base for refueling, Colonel MacDonald again took off, this time leading a flight of four P-38's. While on patrol, a formation approximating seven enemy fighters jumped his flight from the rear, shooting down number three man. Though outnumbered more than two to one, Colonel MacDonald skillfully forced two of the enemy planes to break flight and in the ensuing dog-fight personally accounted for two more enemy planes, and set up another for his wing man who shot it down, thus again breaking up an enemy attack at a critical time and saving much valuable shipping. His initiative, aggressiveness and outstanding leadership in these actions enabled him to destroy three enemy aircraft and contribute to the destruction of two more, bringing his total victories to twenty-four. Colonel MacDonald's heroic action and example of leadership exemplify the highest traditions of the military service.

Distinguished Service Cross citation (2nd Award)

MacDonald, Charles H.
Colonel (Air Corps), U.S. Army Air Forces
457th Fighter Group, 5th Air Force
Date of Action:  December 25, 1944

Citation:
The President of the United States of America, authorized by Act of Congress July 9, 1918, takes pleasure in presenting a Bronze Oak Leaf Cluster in lieu of a Second Award of the Distinguished Service Cross to Colonel (Air Corps) Charles Henry MacDonald (ASN: 0–22518), United States Army Air Forces, for extraordinary heroism in connection with military operations against an armed enemy while serving as Pilot of a P-38 Fighter Airplane in the 475th Fighter Group, Fifth Air Force, in aerial combat against enemy forces on 25 December 1944, in the Southwest Pacific Area of Operations. On that date, Colonel MacDonald shot down three enemy aircraft in a single engagement. It was the second time in less than three weeks that he shot down three aircraft in a single mission. Colonel MacDonald's unquestionable valor in aerial combat is in keeping with the highest traditions of the military service and reflects great credit upon himself, the 5th Air Force, and the United States Army Air Forces.

See also
Thomas B. McGuire
List of World War II air aces

Notes

References

Book

Web

LSU Cadets of Ole War Skule Hall of Honor Honoree 2003

Further reading

1914 births
2002 deaths
American World War II flying aces
Aviators from Pennsylvania
Louisiana State University alumni
People from DuBois, Pennsylvania
Recipients of the Legion of Merit
Recipients of the Distinguished Flying Cross (United States)
United States Army Air Forces officers
United States Army Air Forces pilots of World War II
Recipients of the Air Medal
Recipients of the Silver Star
Recipients of the Distinguished Service Cross (United States)
United States Air Force colonels
United States air attachés
Military personnel from Pennsylvania
American expatriates in Sweden